Neve Zohar is a community settlement in southern Israel. Located on the junction of Highway 31 and Highway 90 (Zohar Junction), on the shores of the Dead Sea and 23 km from Arad by road, it falls under the jurisdiction of Tamar Regional Council.

The village is the closest permanent settlement to the Ein Bokek Dead Sea hotel area and hosts the regional council's offices. It is the lowest village in the world.

History

Neve Zohar was established in 1964 as a work camp for Dead Sea factory workers, although its immediate location was a major transport junction during numerous historical periods. It was named after the Zohar Stream, a wadi that flows into the Dead Sea.

In 2008, Neve Zohar had a population of 30 families.

The village also has a regional elementary school and a museum (Beit HaYotzer, lit. "house of the potter" or "house of the artist-creator") showing Dead Sea-related items. An unused airfield is situated slightly to the southeast of the village.

References

External links
Neve Zohar website 
Neve Zohar Negev Information Centre 

Community settlements
Tamar Regional Council
Populated places in Southern District (Israel)
Populated places established in 1964
1964 establishments in Israel
Dead Sea